The Sri Lankan Ambassador to China is the Sri Lankan envoy to the People's Republic of China.  He is concurrently accredited as Ambassador to Mongolia and North Korea. The current ambassador is Dr. Karunasena Kodituwakku.

The Sri Lankan ambassador in Beijing is the official representative of the Government in Colombo to the Government of the People's Republic of China and concurrently accredited in Pyongyang (North Korea) and Ulaanbaatar (Mongolia).

List of representatives

See also
List of heads of missions from Sri Lanka

References

Sri Lanka
China